Ro-38 was an Imperial Japanese Navy Kaichū type submarine of the K6 sub-class. Completed and commissioned in July 1943, she served in World War II and was sunk in November 1943 during her first war patrol.

Design and description
The submarines of the K6 sub-class were versions of the preceding K5 sub-class with greater range and diving depth. They displaced  surfaced and  submerged.

For surface running, the boats were powered by two  diesel engines, each driving one propeller shaft. When submerged each propeller was driven by a  electric motor. They could reach  on the surface and  underwater.

The boats were armed with four internal bow  torpedo tubes and carried a total of ten torpedoes. They were also armed with a single  L/40 anti-aircraft gun and two single  AA guns.

Construction and commissioning

Ro-38 was laid down as Submarine No. 204 on 20 June 1942 by Mitsubishi at Kobe, Japan. She was renamed Ro-38 on 1 November 1942, and was provisionally attached to the Maizuru Naval District that day. She was launched on 24 December 1942 and completed and commissioned on 24 July 1943.

Service history

Upon commissioning, Ro-38 was attached formally to the Maizuru Naval District, and on 31 July 1943 she was assigned to Submarine Squadron 11 for workups. On 31 October 1943 she was reassigned to Submarine Division 34 in the  6th Fleet, and she departed Maizuru bound for Truk that day. She arrived at Truk on 8 November 1943.

Ro-38 got underway from Truk on 19 November 1943 to begin her first war patrol, assigned a patrol area in the Gilbert Islands in the vicinity of Makin and Tarawa. The Japanese never heard from her again.

On 20 November 1943, the Battles of Makin and of Tarawa began with the U.S. landings on those atolls. On 26 November 1943, Takagi ordered I-19, I-40, I-169, and Ro-38 to form a patrol line north of Makin, with Ro-38 northeast of Makin at the eastern end of the line. The 6th Fleet ordered Ro-38 to move to a new patrol area southeast of Tarawa on 27 November 1943, and on 4 December 1943 it sent her orders to patrol between Tarawa and Canton Island. Ro-38 did not acknowledge any of these orders.

The circumstances of Ro-38′s loss are unknown. It is possible that the United States Navy destroyer  sank her west of Tarawa on 24 November 1943. On 2 January 1944, the Imperial Japanese Navy declared her to be presumed lost off the Gilbert Islands with all 77 hands. She was stricken from the Navy list on 30 April 1944.

Notes

References
 

 

Ro-35-class submarines
Kaichū type submarines
1942 ships
World War II shipwrecks in the Pacific Ocean
World War II submarines of Japan
Japanese submarines lost during World War II
Maritime incidents in November 1943
Missing submarines of World War II
Ships built by Mitsubishi Heavy Industries
Ships lost with all hands